Eugênio Machado Souto (born 15 May 1948), commonly known as Geninho, is a Brazilian football manager and former player who played as a goalkeeper.

Playing career
Born in Ribeirão Preto, São Paulo, Geninho was a product of hometown side Botafogo-SP. He made his first team debut in 1966, aged just 16, and became a regular starter in the following year.

Geninho subsequently represented Francana, São Bento, Paulista, Caxias, Vitória and Novo Hamburgo, retiring with the latter in 1984 at the age of 36.

Coaching career
Immediately after retiring Geninho started working as a manager, being in charge of his last club Novo Hamburgo. In 1985, he took over another club he represented as a player, Francana, and returned to Botafogo-SP in the following year.

In October 1987, Geninho was appointed manager of Santos, replacing departing Candinho. He moved abroad the following July, being named at the helm of Primeira Liga side Vitória de Guimarães.

With the Portuguese side, Geninho won the 1988 Supertaça Cândido de Oliveira, but was sacked in April 1989. Returning to Brazil, he took over Sãocarlense, Portuguesa Santista and Botafogo-SP before returning to Santos in February 1992, replacing fired Rubens Minelli.

For the 1993 season, Geninho returned to Botafogo before accepting an offer from Saudi Arabia's Al-Shabab, but returned shortly after and took over Fortaleza. In 1994, he coached Ituano and União São João, suffering relegation from the Campeonato Paulista and the Série A, respectively, but ended the season at Vitória.

In 1995 Geninho was at the helm of Comercial and Ponte Preta, suffering relegation from the state league with the latter. He later returned to Vitória, and spent the 1996 season in charge of Juventude.

In 1997, after spells at Guarani and Bahia, Geninho returned to União São João, again suffering top tier relegation. He started the 1998 in charge of Matonense, but later returned to Vitória.

Geninho returned to Juventude ahead of the 1999 season, and later worked with Santo André and União São João throughout the year, suffering relegation with the latter. For the following campaign, he returned to Santo André, but only lasted five matches.

On 29 August 2000, Geninho was appointed at the helm of Paraná, leading the club to the title of Copa João Havelange Group Yellow (equivalent to Série B in that season).

On 8 December 2000, Geninho returned to Santos, but left the following May after being knocked out of the year's Paulistão. He later took over Atlético Paranaense, leading the club to their first-ever Brazilian league title.

On 22 May 2002, Geninho was named Atlético Mineiro manager. On 9 January of the following year, he was appointed at the helm of Corinthians. He resigned on 28 September, after a 6–1 loss at Juventude.

On 15 December 2003, Geninho was announced at Vasco da Gama, but was sacked the following 27 September. On 25 December 2004, he was named manager of Al-Ahli, but returned to his home country the following July and took over Goiás.

Geninho returned to Corinthians on 11 May 2006, leaving on 12 August and returning to Goiás two days later.
 He resigned from the latter club on 7 May 2007, and took over Sport on 19 June.

Geninho was announced as Atlético Mineiro manager on 7 December 2007, but resigned the following 18 May. For the remainder of the campaign, he was in charge of Botafogo and Atlético Paranaense.

Geninho resigned from Furacão in June 2009, and took over Nàutico in the following month. On 20 February 2010, he was appointed in charge of Atlético Goianiense,

Geninho quit Dragão on 7 June 2010, and returned to Sport on 10 August. He left the latter club the following February, and returned to Atlético Paranaense late in the month.

Geninho was dismissed by Furacão on 4 April 2011, and returned to Vitória on 19 May. Relieved from his duties on 24 July, he returned to Comercial the following 28 February.

On 23 April 2012, Geninho was named at the helm of Portuguesa, being sacked on 8 December. In the following five seasons, he was in charge of five different clubs: São Caetano, Sport, Avaí, Ceará and ABC.

On 19 April 2018, Geninho replaced Claudinei Oliveira at Avaí, and finished the season by achieving promotion to the first division. He was sacked on 17 June 2019, and had a nine-month spell in charge of Vitória before returning to the club on 2 August 2020. He resigned on 9 December.

On 17 March 2022, after more than one year without coaching, Geninho returned to Vitória for a fifth spell.

Honours

Manager
Al-Shabab
Saudi Premier League: 1992–93

Vitória Guimarães
Supertaça Cândido de Oliveira: 1998

Atlético Paranaense
Campeonato Brasileiro Série A: 2001

Corinthians
Campeonato Paulista: 2003

Goiás
Campeonato Goiano: 2006

Atlético Goianiense
Campeonato Goiano: 2010

ABC
Campeonato Potiguar: 2016, 2017

Avaí
Campeonato Catarinense: 2019

References

External links

1948 births
Living people
People from Ribeirão Preto
Brazilian footballers
Association football goalkeepers
Botafogo Futebol Clube (SP) players
Associação Atlética Francana players
Esporte Clube São Bento players
Paulista Futebol Clube players
Sociedade Esportiva e Recreativa Caxias do Sul players
Esporte Clube Vitória players
Esporte Clube Novo Hamburgo players
Brazilian football managers
Campeonato Brasileiro Série A managers
Campeonato Brasileiro Série B managers
Campeonato Brasileiro Série C managers
Esporte Clube Novo Hamburgo managers
Associação Atlética Francana managers
Botafogo Futebol Clube (SP) managers
Santos FC managers
Grêmio Esportivo Sãocarlense managers
Associação Atlética Portuguesa (Santos) managers
Fortaleza Esporte Clube managers
União São João Esporte Clube managers
Esporte Clube Vitória managers
Associação Atlética Ponte Preta managers
Esporte Clube Juventude managers
Guarani FC managers
Esporte Clube Bahia managers
Sociedade Esportiva Matonense managers
Ituano FC managers
Esporte Clube Santo André managers
Paraná Clube managers
Club Athletico Paranaense managers
Clube Atlético Mineiro managers
Sport Club Corinthians Paulista managers
CR Vasco da Gama managers
Goiás Esporte Clube managers
Sport Club do Recife managers
Botafogo de Futebol e Regatas managers
Clube Náutico Capibaribe managers
Atlético Clube Goianiense managers
Comercial Futebol Clube (Ribeirão Preto) managers
Associação Desportiva São Caetano managers
Avaí FC managers
Ceará Sporting Club managers
ABC Futebol Clube managers
Primeira Liga managers
Vitória S.C. managers
Associação Atlética Internacional (Limeira) managers
Saudi Professional League managers
Al Shabab FC (Riyadh) managers
Al-Ahli Saudi FC managers
Brazilian expatriate football managers
Brazilian expatriate sportspeople in Portugal
Brazilian expatriate sportspeople in Saudi Arabia
Expatriate football managers in Portugal
Expatriate football managers in Saudi Arabia
Footballers from São Paulo (state)